Hashim peer Dastagir was an Indian Sufi saint according to the tradition of the Qadri Shattari Sufi order. His shrine is in Bijapur, Karnataka, India.

Life

Hashim Peer Dastagir (Arabic: هاشم‎ پیر دستگیر, romanized: Hashim Pir Dastgir) was born in 1576 in Ahmedabad, Gujarat. He was brought up in a scholastic atmosphere under the particular influence of Sayyedina Wajihuddin Alvi.

Muhammad Ghawth gave his khilafat to Wajihuddin Alvi. Later, the khilafat passed to his nephew Hashim peer Dastagir.

Hashim peer went to Bijapur, Karnataka, then under the rule of Ibrahim Adil Shah II. Under his influence Ibrahim Adil Shah then gave up un-Islamic practises. The next Sultan Mohammed Adil Shah was his disciple. When the Sultan was suffering from a serious disease, Hashim peer stated that he is granting to his disciple ten years of his life. As a consequence, the Sultan built the monument of Gol Gumbaz, which is located near the shrine of Hashim peer.

Shrine

His shrine is in Bijapur. the shrine of Hashim peer Dastagir is a symbol of communal harmony, since it attracts the crowds from all religious faiths . The shrine was built by Mohammad Adil Shah in 1649. Every year, thousands of devotees attend the annual Urs celebration of Hashim peer Dastagir.
Sayed Shah Murtuza Husaini Hashimi is the chief of the shrine and a descendant of Hashim Peer Dastagir.

Legacy
Successors of Hashim Peer Dastagir include Haji Wajihuddin Gujrati Alwi Qadri Shattari. Later, the succession passed to Sufi Sarmast Ali Shah Qalandar. His shrine is located in Nandura, Maharashtra. Maulana Muhammad Siddiq was his successor. Succession passed to Muhammad Ghani Qadri Shattari and subsequently to Muhammad Wali Qadri Shattari. Muhammad Ghani's shrine is located in Sufi Nagar Kondhali in Maharashtra. It is said that Mushtaque Husain Qadri Shattari is one of the current figurehead of this order.

See also
 Muhammad Ghawth
Wajihuddin Alvi
 Shattari

References

External links
 
 Silsila Shuttariya, Qadriya (archived)
 The Sufis of Bijapur, 1300-1700 Richard Maxwell Eaton Publication Year: 2015
 Sufi Saints in Karnataka

Indian Sufis
Date of death unknown
Year of birth unknown
Year of death unknown